Felix Genn (born 6 March 1950) is a German bishop of the Catholic Church who is currently the Bishop of Münster. Previously, he was the Bishop of Essen and, prior to that, was an Auxiliary Bishop of Trier. Since 2013, he has been a member of the Congregation for Bishops.

Early life and education 
Genn was born on 6 March 1950 in the town of Burgbrohl, which is located in the Ahrweiler district of the German state of Rhineland-Palatinate. He was raised on a farm in Wassenach and graduated from the Kurfürst-Salentin Gymnasium in Andernach in 1969. Between 1969 and 1974, he undertook the study of theology at the University of Trier and the University of Regensburg. Finally, on 29 June 1985, he received his PhD in theology from the University of Trier. He wrote his doctoral thesis on St. Augustine.

Career

Priestly ministry 
Genn was ordained a priest on 11 July 1976 in Trier by Bishop Bernhard Stein. Upon being made a priest, he was appointed a curate of the Holy Cross Church in Bad Kreuznach, a position he held for two years. In 1978, he was made the subregens (assistant head) of the diocesan seminary of Trier, where he remained until 1994. In 1985, he was made the seminary's spiritual director.

From 1994 to 1997, Genn was a permanent lecturer of the theological faculty of the University of Trier. Following this, he was made the regens of the St. Lambert House of Study in the Burg Lantershofen.

Episcopal ministry 
On 16 April 1999, Genn was appointed an Auxiliary Bishop of Trier and simultaneously the Titular Bishop of Uzalis by Pope John Paul II. He was consecrated a bishop in the Cathedral of Trier on 30 May 1999 and was charged as vicar for the Visitation District of Saarland. Bishop Hermann Josef Spital was his principal consecrator, while Bishops Franz-Josef Hermann Bode and Alfred Kleinermeilert were his co-consecrators. On 4 April 2003, he was then transferred by Pope John Paul II with his appointment as the third Bishop of Essen. He was enthroned in the diocese on 6 July 2003.

Genn was appointed the seventy-sixth Bishop of Münster on 19 December 2008 by Pope Benedict XVI after being elected by the cathedral chapter, succeeding Reinhard Lettmann. He was enthroned in the diocese on 29 March 2009. On 21 August 2010, he was awarded honorary citizenship of Wassenach.

As part of a major political shake-up of the Congregation for Bishops on 16 December 2013, Pope Francis appointed Genn as a member of the congregation, succeeding Cardinal Joachim Meisner.

Coat of arms 

Upon being made a bishop, Genn took up an episcopal coat of arms. Upon being made Bishop of Münster, he adopted a new coat of arms. On his current coat of arms, the yellow and red striped fields on the top left and bottom right of the shield are taken from the Diocese of Münster's coat of arms. The eagle in the top right field is indicative of Genn's hometown of Wassenach, as an eagle is present in its coat of arms, and is a remnant of his previous coats of arms as Bishop of Essen and Auxiliary Bishop of Trier.

The seven heads of grain in the lower left field reference Genn's peasant background. However, their number also symbolizes the fullness of life and believers of God who gather from all directions with a hunger and thirst for life.

Positions 
Genn supports Synodal Path in Germany. He supported a document "Leben in gelingenden Beziehungen - Grundlinien einer erneuerten Sexualethik", in which a reform of Rom-catholic sexual ethic is part of the text, for example for same-sex partnerships.

References

External links 

Diocese of Münster
Diocese of Essen
Diocese of Trier

Living people
20th-century German Roman Catholic bishops
21st-century German Roman Catholic bishops
Roman Catholic bishops of Münster
Roman Catholic bishops of Essen
1950 births
People from Ahrweiler (district)
University of Trier alumni
20th-century German Catholic theologians
21st-century German Catholic theologians
20th-century German Roman Catholic priests
21st-century Roman Catholic bishops in Germany